Thomas O'Leary may refer to:
 Thomas James O'Leary, American actor
 Thomas Michael O'Leary, American Roman Catholic bishop
 Tomás O'Leary, Irish rugby union player